The 1993–94 GET-ligaen season was the 55th season of ice hockey in Norway. Ten teams participated in the league, and Lillehammer IK won the championship.

Grunnserien

Eliteserien

Playoff Qualification

Group A

Group B

Playoffs

Relegation

External links
Season on hockeyarchives.info

GET-ligaen seasons
Norway
GET